The Sheesh Mahal Cricket Tournament is India's oldest summer cricket tournament and in its hey day was a most prestigious one which attracted teams from all parts of India.

A bubbling youth and a cricket maniac rolled in one, M.Askari Hasan in 1951 thought cricket confined to winter months was not enough. To satiate his thirst for more cricket and an extended cricket season he stumbled upon the idea of organising a cricket tournament in summers. He made a small beginning but met with instant success when within a few years, teams from Kanpur and adjoining districts started vying for participating in this Sheesh Mahal Summer Cricket Tournament.

The first name that comes to mind is of late Lallan Sahib who rendered such singular assistance to M.Askari Hasan that it would be fair to say that but for the yeoman services of late Lallan Sahib, Askari Hasan's job would indeed have been hazardous. Lallan Sahib prepared the pitches, spread and marked the malting, in vogue then and consequently for matches to start at 6 a.m. his day began at 3 a.m.!

As the tournament started attracting more and more teams, its requirements grew and Askari Hasan was indeed lucky as his bunch of friends came in handy and turned out to be devoted and selfless in their service. Some of the notable original members of the club included late Mr. A. L. Bose and late Mr. Wali Ahmad. A. L. Bose can be credited for mooting the idea of bringing out a tournament souvenir which might fetch some funds, through advertisements.

Askari Hasan's service in the U. P Civil Secretariat was a great boon for the success of the tournament. The senior officers took keen interest, encouraged, and patronized in all possible ways and this patronage continues to be forthcoming even to this day although so many of them have retired. The Secretariate also proved to be a very fertile institution which provided a set of exceedingly sincere, devoted and selfless assisting hands to the tournament helping it to flourish and bloom in what it is today.

The first tournament was organized away back in 1951 and the club operated primarily from the old city of Lucknow.

It was the dream of M.Askari Hasan a passionate cricket enthusiast of Lucknow.

Aslam Agha and Asad Zaidi Were Also Active Member In The SheeshMahal Tournament.

.

Indian domestic cricket competitions
1951 establishments in India
Recurring sporting events established in 1951